Actizera stellata, the red-clover blue, is a butterfly of the family Lycaenidae. It is found in South Africa, Ethiopia, southern Sudan, Kenya, Uganda, Zaire, Tanzania and northern Malawi. In South Africa it is found in the East Cape and the southern part of the Orange Free State.

The wingspan is 13–18 mm for males and 15–19 mm for females. Adults are on wing from January to May, with a peak from January to February. There is one extended generation per year.

The larvae feed on Trifolium africanum.

References

Seitz, A. Die Gross-Schmetterlinge der Erde 13: Die Afrikanischen Tagfalter. Plate XIII 74 i

Butterflies described in 1883
Polyommatini
Butterflies of Africa
Taxa named by Roland Trimen